Alan L. Hart (also known as Robert Allen Bamford Jr., October 4, 1890 – July 1, 1962) was an American physician, radiologist, tuberculosis researcher, writer, and novelist.

Hart pioneered the use of x-ray photography in tuberculosis detection and helped implement TB screening programs that saved thousands of lives.

As a fiction author, Hart published over 9 short stories and 4 novels, which incorporated drama, romance, and medical themes.

Circa 1917, Hart was one of the first trans men to undergo hysterectomy in the United States.

Early life

Hart was born Alberta Lucille Hart on October 4, 1890, in Halls Summit, Coffey County, Kansas, to Albert L. Hart and Edna Hart (née Bamford). When his father died of typhoid fever in 1892, his mother reverted to her maiden name and moved the family to Linn County, Oregon. When Hart was five years old his mother remarried, to Bill Barton, and the family moved to Edna's father's farm. Hart wrote later, in 1911, of his happiness during this time, when he was free to present as male, playing with boys' toys made for him by his grandfather. His parents and grandparents largely accepted and supported his gender expression, though his mother described his "desire to be a boy" as "foolish." His grandparents' obituaries, from 1921 and 1924, both list Hart as a grandson. When Hart was 12 the family moved to Albany. There Hart was obliged to present as female to attend school, where he was treated as a girl. He continued to spend the holidays at his grandfather's farm, presenting as male among his male friends, "teasing the girls and playing boy's games". According to a reminiscence piece in the Halls Summit News of June 10, 1921, "Young Hart was different, even then. Boys' clothes just felt natural. Hart always regarded himself as a boy and begged his family to cut his hair and let him wear trousers. Hart disliked dolls but enjoyed playing doctor. He hated traditional girl tasks, preferring farm work with the menfolk instead. The self reliance that became a lifelong trait was evident early: once when he accidentally chopped off his fingertip with an axe, Hart dressed it himself, saying nothing about it to the family."

During his school years, Hart was allowed to write essays under his chosen name "Robert Allen Bamford, Jr." with little resistance from his classmates or teachers. It was common at the time for writers to use pseudonyms, including to assume names associated with the opposite gender. Hart published work in local newspapers and in school and college publications under this name, or as "submitted by an anonymous boy", or using the neutral "A.L.H." or "A. Hart". He used his legal name only under pressure from peers or seniors. His early work dealt with masculine subjects, even when he was asked to write on topics about life as a woman. When asked to write about female classmates or friends he portrayed them as prize fighters or boyish basketball players.

Hart attended Albany College (now Lewis & Clark College), then transferred with classmate and romantic partner Eva Cushman to Stanford University for the 1911–1912 school year before going back to Albany. Hart graduated from Albany College in 1912, and in 1917 obtained a doctor of medicine degree from the University of Oregon Medical Department in Portland (now Oregon Health & Science University); during this period, Hart also returned to Northern California to attend courses in the summer of 1916 at the Stanford University School of Medicine, then located in San Francisco. Hart was deeply unhappy that the medical degree was issued in his female name, limiting his opportunities to use it in any future life under a male name. College records show that at least one of the senior staff was sympathetic; his graduation records were indexed internally as "Hart, Lucile (aka Robert L.), M.D.". Nonetheless, Hart knew that if he presented himself as Robert, any prospective employer checking his credentials would discover the female name or find no records for him at all. After graduation he worked for a short while (presenting as a woman) at a Red Cross hospital in Philadelphia.

Tuberculosis research 
Hart devoted much of his career to research into and treatment of tuberculosis. In the early 20th century the disease was the biggest killer in America. Doctors, including Hart, were realizing that myriad illnesses (consumption, phthisis, phthisis pulmonalis, Koch's disease, scrofula, lupus vulgaris, white plague, King's evil, Pott's disease and Gibbus) were all cases of tuberculosis (TB). TB usually attacked victims' lungs first; Hart was among the first physicians to document how it then spread, via the circulatory system, causing lesions on the kidneys, spine, and brain, eventually resulting in death. Scientists had discovered in the nineteenth century that tuberculosis was not hereditary, but an airborne bacillus spread rapidly among persons in close proximity by coughing and sneezing. This meant it might be treated, but with no cure for the disease in its advanced stages the only hope for sufferers was early detection.

X-rays, or Roentgen rays as they were more commonly known until World War Two, had been discovered only in 1895, when Hart was five years old. In the early twentieth century they were used to detect bone fractures and tumors, but Hart became interested in their potential for detecting tuberculosis. Since the disease often presented no symptoms in its early stages, x-ray screening was invaluable for early detection. Even rudimentary early x-ray machines could detect the disease before it became critical. This allowed early treatment, often saving the patient's life. It also meant sufferers could be identified and isolated from the population, greatly lessening the spread of the disease. Public fund-raising drives, like the newly created Christmas Seal campaign, helped finance these efforts. By the time antibiotics were introduced in the 1940s, doctors using the techniques Hart developed had managed to cut the tuberculosis death toll down to one fiftieth.

In 1937 Hart was hired by the Idaho Tuberculosis Association and later became the state's Tuberculosis Control Officer. He established up Idaho's first fixed-location and mobile TB screening clinics and spearheaded the state's war against tuberculosis. Between 1933 and 1945 Hart traveled extensively through rural Idaho, covering thousands of miles while lecturing, conducting mass TB screenings, training new staff, and treating the effects of the epidemic.

An experienced and accessible writer, Hart wrote widely for medical journals and popular publications, describing TB for technical and general audiences and giving advice on its prevention, detection, and cure. At the time the word "tuberculosis" carried a social stigma akin to venereal disease, so Hart insisted his clinics be referred to as "chest clinics", himself as a "chest doctor", and his patients as "chest patients". Discretion and compassion were important tools in treating the stigmatised disease.

In 1943 Hart, now recognised as preeminent in the field of tubercular Roentgenology, compiled his extensive evidence on TB and other x-ray-detectable cases into a definitive compendium, These Mysterious Rays: A Nontechnical Discussion of the Uses of X-rays and Radium, Chiefly in Medicine (pub. Harper & Brothers), still a standard text today. The book was translated into several languages, including Spanish.

In 1948 Hart was appointed Director of Hospitalization and Rehabilitation for the Connecticut State Tuberculosis Commission. As in Idaho, Hart took charge of a massive statewide x-ray screening program for TB, emphasizing the importance of early detection and treatment. He held this position for the rest of his life, and is credited with helping contain the spread of tuberculosis in Connecticut as he had previously in the Pacific Northwest. Similar programs based on his leadership and methodology in this field in other states also saved many thousands of lives.

Personal life

Transition 
Upon reaching adulthood Hart sought psychiatric counselling and surgery to continue passing as a man. Hart's was the first documented transgender male transition in the United States, though sex reassignment surgeries had been carried out earlier in Germany, including on one man, treated by German sexologist Magnus Hirschfeld, who had won the right to serve in the German military.  The 1906–1907 case of Karl M. Baer had set a new precedent for sex reassignment surgery by enlisting simultaneous support from psychiatric, legal, and surgical quarters. There was now medical and legal precedent for transitioning; Hart's approach to his own transition appears to have drawn on the Baer case.

In 1917, Hart approached Joshua Allen Gilbert, Ph.D., M.D., at the University of Oregon and requested surgery to eliminate menstruation and the possibility of ever becoming pregnant. He also presented Gilbert with a eugenic argument, that a person with "abnormal inversion" should be sterilized. Gilbert was initially reluctant, but accepted that Hart was "extremely intelligent and not mentally ill, but afflicted with a mysterious disorder for which I [Gilbert] have no explanation." He accepted that Hart experienced himself only as a male, who described himself using phrases including "the other fellows and I" and asking "what could a fellow do?" Gilbert wrote, in case notes published in the Journal of Nervous and Mental Disease in 1920, that "from a sociological and psychological standpoint [Hart] is a man" and that living as one was Hart's only chance for a happy existence, "the best that can be done." Gilbert addressed the fact that Hart already passed as male, stating, "Many kodak pictures of H have been exhibited as those of a man without being questioned." He added, "Let him who finds in himself a tendency to criticize to offer some constructive method of dealing with the problem on hand. He will not want for difficulties. The patient and I have done our best with it."

Early FTM surgeries involved the implanting of testicular tissue in place of the removed ovaries. Crystalline male hormones had been extracted in usable quantities from male urine by 1903, but it represented an infection risk.

Hart's surgery was completed at the University of Oregon Medical School over the 1917–1918 winter vacation. He then legally changed his name.

He interned at San Francisco Hospital. A former classmate recognized him there, and he was outed as transgender in the Spokesman-Review newspaper on Feb. 6, 1918. The article's opening sentence referred to him by his birth name and with female pronouns, describing him as having graduated from Stanford "as a fluffy coed...[who] affected boyish mannerisms."

In February 1918 he married his first wife, Inez Stark, at a Congregational church and moved with her to Gardiner, Oregon, to set up his own medical practice.

In an interview with a local paper, Hart declared that he was "happier since I made this change than I ever have in my life, and I will continue this way as long as I live [...] I have never concealed anything regarding my [change] to men's clothing [...] I came home to show my friends that I am ashamed of nothing."

Synthetic hormones were not manufactured until 1920 (by Bayer), and when given the opportunity, Hart began taking testosterone. This treatment led to masculinization including a lower-pitched voice and ability to grow facial hair.

Life after transition 
In Oregon, Hart suffered an early blow when a former medical school classmate outed him as transgender, forcing Hart and his wife to move. Hart found the experience traumatic and again consulted Gilbert, who wrote that Hart had suffered from "the hounding process ... which our modern social organization can carry on to such perfection and refinement." Hart set up a new practice in remote Huntley, Montana, writing later that he "did operations in barns and houses...('til) the crash of the autumn of 1920 wiped out most of the Montana farmers and stockmen, and me along with them". He then took itinerant work, until in 1921, on a written recommendation from noted doctor Harriet J. Lawrence (decorated by President Wilson for developing a flu vaccine), he secured a post as staff physician at Albuquerque Sanatorium.

The relocations, financial insecurity, and secrecy placed strain on Hart's marriage, and Inez left him in September 1923. She ordered him to have no further contact with her, and divorced him in 1925. The same year Hart married his second wife, Edna Ruddick; the union lasted until the end of Hart's life. In 1925 Hart moved to the Trudeau School of Tuberculosis in New York, where he also carried out postgraduate work; he spent 1926–1928 as a clinician at the Rockford TB sanatorium in Illinois. In 1928 Hart obtained a master's degree in Radiology from the University of Pennsylvania; he was in 1929 appointed Director of Radiology at Tacoma General Hospital. During the 1930s the couple moved to Idaho, where Hart worked during the 1930s and early 1940s; his work also took him to Washington, where he held a research fellowship as a roentgenologist in Spokane. During the war Hart was also a medical adviser at the Army Recruiting and Induction headquarters in Seattle, while Edna worked for the King County Welfare Department in the same city.

In 1948, after Hart obtained a master's degree in public health from Yale, the couple moved to Connecticut, where Hart had been appointed Director of Hospitalization and Rehabilitation for the Connecticut State Tuberculosis Commission. The couple lived for the rest of their lives in West Hartford, Connecticut, where Edna became a professor at the University of Hartford. After the Second World War synthetic testosterone became available in the US, and for the first time Hart was able to grow a beard and shave. He also developed a deeper voice, making him more confident and his public appearances easier.

During the last six years of his life Hart gave numerous lectures, and dedicated all his free time to fundraising for medical research and to support patients with advanced TB who could not afford treatment. He was a member of the American Thoracic Society, American Public Health Association, American Association for the Advancement of Science, and American Civil Liberties Union, among many others. Socially, both he and Edna were well liked, active community leaders. Alan was of Protestant faith and served for eight years as vice president for his local Unitarian Church council.

Hart died of heart failure on July 1, 1962. The terms of his will directed his body be cremated and his ashes scattered over Puget Sound where he and Edna had spent many happy summers together.

Hart said once, in a speech to graduating medical students, "Each of us must take into account the raw material which heredity dealt us at birth and the opportunities we have had along the way, and then work out for ourselves a sensible evaluation of our personalities and accomplishments".

Fiction writing
Alongside his medical practice and research, Hart pursued a second career as a novelist. He had in early life published in local, school, and college magazines, and later published four novels, chiefly on medical themes. His four novels incorporate semi-autobiographical themes: The Undaunted (1936) contains a doctor, Richard Cameron, who describes himself as a 'cripple' after his foot is amputated following persistent bone infection. Cameron worries that this physical defect will drive women away, but ends up marrying his sweetheart. A second character, a radiologist named Sandy Farquhar, is a gay man who has been harassed and tormented, driven from job to job, over his sexuality. Farquhar, who is short, thin, and bespectacled, resembles Hart physically, and considers himself "the possessor of a defective body" from which he wishes to escape, a typical asset of gender dysphoria. Another novel, In the Lives of Men, contains a gay male character with a missing arm.

Early short stories
These short stories were collected in The Life and Career of Alberta Lucille/Dr. Alan L. Hart, with collected early writings, by Brian Booth.

1908: Frankfort Center (Published in the Albany High School Whirlwind) 
For an assignment to write about female college members and sporting activities, Hart described the ambiguously named "Frances", a prize boxer and basketball player.

1909: My Irish Colleen (Published anonymously in the Albany College Student, March 1909 issue)
A love poem, presented as the work of an anonymous male student about an Irish girl. It was reprinted in his college yearbook in 1911, under his female name, outing his crush on Eva Cushman.

1909: To the Faculty (Published in the Albany College Student, March 1909 issue)
A call for student rebellion and statement of the need of students to be taken seriously. The work discusses doves spreading their wings and flying, reflecting Hart's sense of confinement while forced to live as a sedate young woman.

1909: The American 'Martha (Published in the Albany College Student, December 1909 issue)
A critical take on the fate of women obliged to be housewives, and raising their daughters to the same destiny. The piece quoted the Bible and reflected a concern for women's rights.

1909: Ma' on the Football Hero (Published in the Albany College Student, December 1909 issue)
Hart questions "what would his mother would say if he were to be a rough and tough College football hero?"

1910: The Magic of Someday (Published in the Albany College Student, January 1910 issue)
A lament on the destruction of Hart's childhood dreams of freedom when he was obliged to be female; ending with hope for a future in which he, "with a heart of a man," might be happy.

1910: The National Triune (Published in the Albany College Student, February 1910 issue)
Published as the work of "Lucille Hart", the story condemns contemporary politic scandals and the injustice of sexism, and sets out Hart's ideas about the character of a true and respectable man.

1910: The Unwritten Law of the Campus (Published in the Albany College Student, March 1910 issue)
A discussion of the difference between moral laws, physical laws, and laws of convention, with reference to discourtesy of someone who tells tales on another student for contravening gender norms.

1911: An Idyll of a Country Childhood (Published in "The Takenah" (Albany College Yearbook) 1911)
By now Hart's habits of male dress outside school were well-known, and this story frankly described his early life and its freedom to dress and live as a boy.

Novels
1935: Doctor Mallory (Published W.W. Norton & Company, Inc.) 
An overnight best-seller, Hart's first novel drew on his experiences as a small-town doctor in Gardiner, Oregon. It portrayed the medical profession as increasingly venal, and was the first exposé of the medical world by a working doctor.

1936: The Undaunted (Published W.W. Norton & Company, Inc.) 
This novel showed gay physician "Sandy Farquhar" pursuing a career in radiology "because he thought it wouldn't matter so much in a laboratory what a man's personality was," conflicts and themes which Hart himself had experienced in his early career.

1937: In the Lives of Men (Published W.W. Norton & Company, Inc.) 
Hart's third novel was favorably reviewed for its insights into contemporary medicine, but the reviewer at a national magazine (The Saturday Review of Literature) noted "as a doctor, Hart knows surprisingly little about women".

1942: Doctor Finlay Sees it Through (Published by Harper & Brothers) 
Hart's final novel, not to be confused with A. J. Cronin's Dr Finlay's Casebook, is considered to have influenced subsequent medical fiction. Another semi-autobiographical account, it revolves around John Finlay, a relatively wealthy doctor who owns his own practice during the Great Depression.

Legacy
After Hart's death his wife acted on his wish to establish a fund for research into leukaemia, from which his mother had died. The interest on his estate is donated annually to the Alan L. and Edna Ruddick Hart Fund, which makes grants for research into leukaemia and its cure.

Hart's will, written in 1943, stipulated that his personal letters and photographs be destroyed, and this was done on his death in 1962. Hart had acted all his life to control the interpretation of his private and emotional life, and the destruction of his personal records at his death were commensurate with this goal. Believing that the secret of his personal history was safe he made no attempt to account for his own life. His identity as the pseudonymous "H" in Gilbert's notes was discovered posthumously by Jonathan Ned Katz, and his identity described as lesbian. Katz's attempts to learn more about Hart's life by contacting Hart's widow were discouraged by Edna Ruddick Hart. The message passed on by her friend in Albany was: "Let that all be passed now. She is older and does not want any more heart ache now."

Controversy
Scholarship on Hart's life has disagreed bitterly on whether he should be characterised as transgender, or lesbian, while activists and advocates for various groups have claimed Hart as a representative.

Jonathan Ned Katz, who in Gay American History: Lesbians and Gay Men in the U.S.A. (1976) first identified Hart as the pseudonymous "H" in Joseph Gilbert's 1920s case notes, described Hart as a lesbian and depicted his case as one where contemporary strictures against lesbianism were so strong that a 'woman' like Hart had to adopt a male identity to pursue love affairs with women. Katz contended again in his 1983 Gay/Lesbian Almanac: A New Documentary that Hart was "clearly a lesbian, a woman-loving woman", but has since said he would not make such claims today.

Against Katz's claims, others like Jillian Todd Weiss have asserted that Hart experienced himself as a man from early childhood, identifying transphobia and "blatant disregard for transgender identities" in the claim that Hart was 'really' a woman. Hart's widow refused interviews to Katz, offended by his categorization of her husband (and by extension, herself) as lesbian.

Some historians note that Hart never described himself as transsexual, but the term was not published until the 1920s, and not widely used until the 1960s, near Hart's death. It is also true that Hart worked hard to keep his pre-transition identity secret, and would hardly have sought to publicly claim a trans identity. Others, then, have contended that Hart was a trans pioneer, who lived after his transition exclusively as a man, just as modern transgender people do.

Joy Parks describes the battle, especially within Portland, Oregon GLBT communities over Hart's identity as "extremely ugly" and one in which "neither side appeared particularly victorious."

Additional media

Exhibitions
 In 2002 the Aubrey Watzek Library at Lewis & Clark College ran an exhibition on Hart's life and early writings, titled "The Lives of Men": A Literary Glimpse at the Life of Alberta Lucille Hart/Dr. Alan L. Hart, a title drawing on one of Hart's novels. The exhibition's run was extended by nearly a month in light of unexpectedly high interest.
 In 1994, the story of Alan Lucille Hart and Eva Cushman's attendance at Stanford University, along with a brief description of their subsequent lives, was included in the historical exhibition "Coming to Terms: Passionate Friendship to Gay Liberation on the Farm" at Cecil H. Green Library at Stanford. The exhibition was curated by independent scholar Gerard Koskovich; it ran from July through October 1994 and was the subject of a feature article in the Stanford Daily. Note that "the farm" in the exhibition title is a nickname for the Stanford campus.
 Hart and Cushman's story also was featured in a second historical exhibition at Stanford University: "Creating Queer Space at Stanford: Pages From a Student Scrapbook," which was on display in April and May 2004 in the second floor lobby of Tresidder Memorial Union on the Stanford campus. The exhibition was curated by independent scholar Gerard Koskovich, with Stanford undergraduate Hunter Hargraves serving as associate curator.

Describing Hart as transsexual/transgender
 Bair, Henry. "Lucille Hart Story" and Brian Booth "Alan Hart: A Literary Footnote", in Right to Privacy Ninth Annual Lucille Hart Dinner Booklet (October 6, 1990).
 Bates, Tom. "Decades ago, an Oregon Doctor Tried to Define Gender"" The Oregonian (July 14, 1996).
 Koskovich, Gerard. "Gay at Stanford: Past, Present and Future" (panel discussion sponsored by the Stanford Historical Society at Stanford University, Dec. 3, 2009). Koskovich was one of three presenters; his talk mentions Hart as a forebear of the transgender rights movement. A podcast of the panel is available on the Stanford Historical Society website .

Describing Hart as lesbian
 Katz, Jonathan. Gay American History: Lesbians and Gay Men in the U.S.A. New York City: Thomas Y. Crowell, 1976.
 Katz, Jonathan Ned. Gay/Lesbian Almanac: A New Documentary. New York City: Harper and Row, 1983.
 Lauderdale, Thomas M., and Cook, Tom. "The Incredible Life and Loves of the Legendary Lucille Hart," Alternative Connection, Vol. 2, Nos. 12 and 13 (September and October 1993).
 Miller, Janet, and Schwartz, Judith. Lesbian Physicians Sideshow, created for American Association of Physicians for Human Rights Conference, Portland, Oregon (August 19, 1993).

General works
 Booth, Brian. The Life and Career of Alberta Lucille/Dr. Alan L. Hart with Collected Early Writings. Lewis & Clark College, Portland, OR. 1999.
 Koskovich, Gerard. "Private Lives, Public Struggles," Stanford, Vol. 21, No. 2 (June 1993).
 A compilation of Hart's college writings from the Lewis & Clark College Special Collections, accompanied by an overview and timeline of Hart's life by Brian Booth:  PDF version from Lewis and Clark College.

See also
 List of LGBT people from Portland, Oregon

References

1890 births
1962 deaths
Oregon Health & Science University alumni
Lewis & Clark College alumni
Stanford University alumni
Yale School of Medicine
20th-century American novelists
American male novelists
American medical writers
Transgender men
Transgender novelists
LGBT physicians
Transgender scientists
Gender-affirming surgery (female-to-male)
LGBT people from Kansas
American LGBT scientists
American radiologists
People from Linn County, Oregon
Physicians from Oregon
Medical fiction writers
American LGBT novelists
Yale School of Public Health alumni
Physicians from Kansas
20th-century American male writers
20th-century American non-fiction writers
American male non-fiction writers
People from Gardiner, Oregon
Historical figures with ambiguous or disputed gender identity
20th-century American LGBT people
LGBT history in Oregon
American transgender writers